Lieutenant General Leon Scott Rice (born 27 May 1958) is the former director of the Air National Guard. He previously served as The Adjutant General (TAG) and Commander of the Massachusetts National Guard and as an assistant to Gen Mark A. Welsh III, former commander of the United States Air Forces in Europe.  Rice has also served as commander of USAF Forces deployed for United States Central Command in the Middle East Area of Operations.  He is a Boeing 777 first officer flying for United Airlines (though currently on a military leave of absence) in Washington Dulles International Airport.  On 3 April 2012 he was appointed by Governor Deval Patrick as The Adjutant General (TAG) of the Massachusetts National Guard and reappointed as The Adjutant General by Governor Charles Baker on 12 May 2015. Rice retired from the U.S. Air Force on 1 August 2020 after over 40 years of service.

Early life
Rice was born 27 May 1958 to Leon Harold Rice (1919–2002) and Margery Ann (Miller) Rice (1918–2005) in Bedford, New Hampshire; a military family with his mother serving as a captain during WWII in the Army Nurse Corps, and eventually becoming in 1990 a Commander of the Department of New Hampshire Veterans of Foreign Wars.  Rice is a direct descendant of Edmund Rice, an early immigrant to Massachusetts Bay Colony.  Rice attended local public schools and earned the rank of Eagle Scout in 1972.

Career
Rice was the director of the Air National Guard, The Pentagon, Washington, D.C. He is responsible for formulating, developing and coordinating all policies, plans and programs affecting more than 105,500 Guard members and civilians in more than 90 wings and 175 geographically separated units across 213 locations throughout the 50 States, the District of Columbia, Puerto Rico, Guam and the Virgin Islands.

Rice was commissioned in 1980 through the Reserve Officer Training Corps at Rensselaer Polytechnic Institute, Troy, New York and graduated from undergraduate pilot training at Reese Air Force Base, Texas in 1982. He is a command pilot with more than 4,300 hours in the F-111 and A-10. Before assuming his current position, General Rice served as The Adjutant General of the Massachusetts National Guard, responsible for commanding units of the Air and Army National Guard.

He has served in various operational and staff assignments, including commander of US Air Force Forces deployed to Middle East locations under the United States Central Command; where, from 1995 to 2006, he was mobilized and deployed to Bosnia, Kosovo, Kuwait, Iraq, Jordan, Oman, and Pakistan. He has commanded a squadron, operations group, and fighter wing. He previously served as the assistant adjutant general for air, and commander of Massachusetts Air National Guard, chairman of the Air Guard Force Structure and Modernization committee of the Adjutants General Association of the United States (AGAUS), as the association's secretary, as a member of the Reserve Forces Policy Board for the Department of Defense, and has served on several General Officer Steering Committees for the National Guard.

Rice was nominated for promotion to lieutenant general and assignment as director of the Air National Guard by Barack Obama on 4 April 2016. This nomination was confirmed by the United States Senate on 28 April 2016. He assumed the position of Director of the Air National Guard on 10 May 2016. In August 2020, Colorado National Guard Adjutant General Michael A. Loh succeeded Rice as director.

Education
 1980 Bachelor of Science in industrial engineering, Reserve Officers' Training Corps, Rensselaer Polytechnic Institute, Troy, New York
 1981 Master of Science in Industrial Engineering, Rensselaer Polytechnic Institute, Troy, New York
 2000 Air War College, by correspondence
 2009 Harvard University, National and International Security Studies, Cambridge, Massachusetts
 2009 George C. Marshall European Center for Security Studies, Garmisch-Partenkirchen, Germany
 2010 George C. Marshall European Center for Security Studies, Garmisch-Partenkirchen, Germany
 2010 Capstone Military Leadership Program, Fort Lesley J. McNair, Washington, District of Columbia
 2011 Senior Reserve Component Officer Course, Army War College, Carlisle Barracks, Pennsylvania
 2011 Combined Force Air Component Commanders Course, Maxwell Air Force Base, Montgomery, Alabama
 2011 Harvard University, National Preparedness Leadership Initiative, [Cambridge, Massachusetts]
 2012 Syracuse University, National Security Studies, [Syracuse, New York]
 2015 Harvard University, National Preparedness Leadership Initiative, [Cambridge, Massachusetts]

Assignments
 May 1981 – May 1982, student, Undergraduate Pilot Training, Reese Air Force Base, Lubbock, Texas
 May 1982 – July 1982, student, AT-38B Lead-In Training Course, Holloman Air Force Base, New Mexico
 July 1982 – January 1983, student, F-111 United States Air Force Operation Training Course, Cannon Air Force Base, New Mexico
 January 1983 – November 1984, aircraft commander, F-111, 493rd Tactical Fighter Wing, Royal Air Force Lakenheath, England
 November 1984 – October 1985, instructor aircraft commander, F-111, 493rd Tactical Fighter Wing, Royal Air Force Lakenheath, England
 October 1985 – December 1985, student, Squadron Officer School, Maxwell Air Force Base, Alabama
 December 1985 – May 1986, student, F-111 Fighter Weapons Instructor Course, Mountain Home Air Force Base, Idaho
 May 1986 – April 1987, chief of weapons and tactics/instructor pilot, F-111, 493rd Tactical Fighter Wing, Royal Air Force Lakenheath, England
 April 1987 – April 1988, instructor pilot, F-111, 391st Tactical Fighter Squadron, Mountain Home Air Force Base, Idaho
 April 1988 – November 1989, chief of Wing Weapons Section, 366th Tactical Fighter Wing, Mountain Home Air Force Base, Idaho
 November 1989 – January 1992, pilot, A-10, 131st Tactical Fighter Squadron, Barnes Air National Guard Base, Westfield, Massachusetts
 February 1992 – December 1994, pilot, A-10, 131st Fighter Squadron, Barnes Air National Guard Base, Westfield, Massachusetts
 December 1994 – December 1995, assistant flight commander of 131st Fighter Squadron, Barnes Air National Guard Base, Westfield, Massachusetts
 December 1995 – June 1997, instructor pilot, A-10, 131st Fighter Squadron, Barnes Air National Guard Base, Westfield, Massachusetts
 June 1997 – June 1998, commander of Operations Support Flight, 131st Fighter Squadron, Barnes Air National Guard Base, Westfield, Massachusetts
 June 1998 – September 1999, commander of Operations Support Flight, 104th Operations Support Flight, Barnes Air National Guard Base, Westfield, Massachusetts
 June 2002 – April 2004, commander of 104th Operations Group, Barnes Air National Guard Base, Westfield, Massachusetts
 May 2004 – July 2007, director of operations, J2, Massachusetts Joint Force Headquarters, Massachusetts National Guard, Milford, Massachusetts
 July 2007 – September 2010, assistant adjutant general-air, Massachusetts National Guard, Milford, Massachusetts
 September 2010 – present, chief of staff, Massachusetts Air National Guard, Milford, Massachusetts; dual hatted, February 2010 – February 2011, (A-6), assistant to the director, Air National Guard; dual-hatted, March 2011 – present, assistant to the commander of United States Air Forces Europe
 April 2012 – May 2016, The Adjutant General, Massachusetts National Guard, Hanscom Air Force Base, Massachusetts
 May 2016 – August 2020, director of the Air National Guard, the Pentagon, Washington, D.C.

Awards and decorations

Other achievements
 1972 Eagle Scout
 2005 George W. Bush Award for Leadership in the Guard/Reserve

Effective dates of promotion

References

Notes

Citations

1958 births
Living people
United States Air Force generals
National Guard (United States) generals
Recipients of the Legion of Merit
Recipients of the Air Medal
Rensselaer Polytechnic Institute alumni
Harvard Kennedy School alumni
Adjutants General of Massachusetts